The Wintun are members of several related Native American peoples of Northern California, including the Wintu (northern), Nomlaki (central), and Patwin (southern). Their range is from approximately present-day Lake Shasta to San Francisco Bay, along the western side of the Sacramento River to the Coast Range. Each of these tribes speak one of the Wintuan languages.  Linguistic and archaeological evidence suggests that the Wintun people probably entered the California area around 500 AD from what is now southern Oregon, introducing bow and arrow technology to the region (Golla 2011: 205).

Federally recognized Wintun tribes 
 Cachil DeHe Band of Wintun Indians of the Colusa Indian Community of the Colusa Rancheria
 Grindstone Indian Rancheria of Wintun-Wailaki Indians
 Kletsel Dehe Wintun Nation, formerly known as the Cortina Indian Rancheria
 Paskenta Band of Nomlaki Indians
 Redding Rancheria
 Round Valley Indian Tribes of the Round Valley Reservation
 Yocha Dehe Wintun Nation formerly known as the Rumsey Indian Rancheria of Wintun Indians

See also 
 Wintu-Nomlaki traditional narratives
 Patwin traditional narratives
 Patwin
 Patwin language
 Wyntoon

Notes

References

 Pritzker, Barry M. A Native American Encyclopedia: History, Culture, and Peoples. Oxford: Oxford University Press, 2000. .
 Golla, Victor. California Indian Languages. Berkeley: University of California Press, 2011. .

Further reading 

 Goddard, Ives. 1996. "The Classification of the Native Languages of North America." In Languages, Ives Goddard, ed., pp. 290–324. Handbook of North American Indians Vol. 17, W. C. Sturtevant, general ed. Washington, D.C.: Smithsonian Institution. .
 Liedtke, Stefan. 2007. The Relationship of Wintuan to Plateau Penutian. LINCOM studies in Native American linguistics, 55. Muenchen: Lincom Europa. 
 Shipley, William F. 1978. "Native Languages of California." In California, Robert F. Heizer, ed., pp. 80–90. Handbook of North American Indians Vol. 8, W. C. Sturtevant, general ed. Washington, D.C.: Smithsonian Institution. .
 Washington, F. B. 1989. Notes on the Northern Wintun Indians. Berkeley, Calif.: California Indian Library Collections Project [distributor].
Whistler, Kenneth W. 1977. "Wintun Prehistory: An Interpretation based on Linguistic Reconstruction of Plant and Animal Nomenclature." ''Proceedings of the Third Annual Meeting of the Berkeley Linguistics Society, February 19–21. pp. 157–174. Berkeley.

External links
 Siskiyous.edu: Wintu peoples 
 Native Tribes, Groups, Language Families and Dialects of California in 1770 (map after Kroeber)

 
Native American tribes in California
Sacramento Valley
History of Amador County, California
History of Butte County, California
History of Colusa County, California
History of El Dorado County, California
History of Glenn County, California
History of Mendocino County, California
History of Napa County, California
History of Nevada County, California
History of Placer County, California
History of Sacramento County, California
History of Shasta County, California
History of Sierra County, California
History of Tehama County, California
History of Yolo County, California
History of Yuba County, California